Stepnoy is a rural locality (a settlement) in Charyshsky Selsoviet, Ust-Kalmansky District, Altai Krai, Russia. The population was 88 as of 2013. There are 4 streets.

Geography 
Stepnoy is located 16 km northwest of Ust-Kalmanka (the district's administrative centre) by road. Charyshskoye is the nearest rural locality.

References 

Rural localities in Ust-Kalmansky District